Evanston is a neighborhood in the city of Cincinnati, Hamilton County, Ohio, United States.

A mostly African-American neighborhood since the 1960s, it is known as "the educating community," and is bordered by the neighborhoods of East Walnut Hills, Hyde Park, North Avondale, and Walnut Hills, as well as the City of Norwood.

The community was originally known as the village of Idlewood. It was renamed in 1893 after the city of Evanston, Illinois. Evanston was annexed to the City of Cincinnati on November 19, 1903.

Demographics
The population of Evanston was 9,491 in the 2020 Census.

O'Bryonville
Evanston is home to the O'Bryonville business district.

O'Bryonville contains Owl's Nest Park.

O'Bryonville was annexed to the City of Cincinnati in 1870.

See als0
 Coca-Cola Bottling Plant (Cincinnati, Ohio)

References

Neighborhoods in Cincinnati
African-American history in Cincinnati